Too Close for Comfort is an American television series.

Too Close for Comfort may also refer to:

 "Too Close for Comfort" (1956 song), by Jerry Bock, George David Weiss, and Larry Holofcener
 Too Close for Comfort, album by Terry and the Pirates; see Buddy Cage and John Cipollina
 "Too Close for Comfort," song by McFly on the album Wonderland
 "Too Close for Comfort," episode of Survivor: Redemption Island

See also
 Too Close for Comfort Site, an archaeological site
 Too Close for Comfort Tour, a concert tour of Darren Hayes